"Days Turn into Nights" is the second single from Delerium's album Music Box Opera featuring singer-songwriter Michael Logen.

Remixes were made by Seven Lions, Solarstone and Andy Caldwell. The last remix is nominated for a Grammy in 2014 for "Best Remixed Recording, Non Classical".

A music video was directed by Stephen Scott. In the video dancers of the Toronto Dance Theatre can be seen.

Track listing
 Digital Release – 2012
 "Days Turn into Nights (Seven Lions Remix)" – 6:07
 "Days Turn into Nights (Andy Caldwell Remix)" – 6:25
 "Days Turn into Nights (Solarstone Pure Mix)" – 6:35
 "Days Turn into Nights (Album Edit)" – 4:02
 "Days Turn into Nights (Andy Caldwell Dub Mix))" – 6:25
 "Days Turn into Nights (Solarstone Pure Dub)" – 8:33
 "Days Turn into Nights (Seven Lions Remix Edit)" – 3:30
 "Days Turn into Nights (Andy Caldwell Remix Edit)" – 3:35
 "Days Turn into Nights (Solarstone Pure Edit)" – 3:43

Charts

References

Delerium songs
2012 songs
2012 singles
Nettwerk Records singles
Songs written by Bill Leeb
Songs written by Rhys Fulber